Saint-Symphorien-sous-Chomérac (literally Saint-Symphorien under Chomérac) is a commune in the Ardèche department in southern France.

Population

See also
Communes of the Ardèche department

References
City Official Site

Communes of Ardèche
Ardèche communes articles needing translation from French Wikipedia